Zöld is a Hungarian surname literally meaning "green". Notable people with the surname include:

Sándor Zöld (1913–1951), Hungarian politician
Zoltán Zöld (born 1979), Hungarian footballer

Hungarian-language surnames